Thelge Marcus Samson Peiris, popularly as Mark Samson (born February 29, 1956  – died 19 January 2019 as මාක් සැම්සන් [Sinhala]) was a Sri Lankan actor in films and television, and a stunt director. Considered one of the best villains in Sinhala cinema, Samson has acted in more than 40 films across many genres primarily as an antagonist.

He died on 19 January 2019, at the age of 63, of a heart attack.

Cinema career
Samson made his debut cinematic appearance in the 1988 film Ayya Nago. He was introduced into silver screen by Wilson Karu. He continued to act in more than 45 Sinhala films across many genres, primarily as a villain. Some of his notable actings came through Raja Daruwo, Rodaya and Siri Daladagamanaya. His last performance was in teledrama Urumayaka Aragalaya as a high-rank English Officer in colonial Ceylon.

Filmography and stunt coordination
 No. denotes the Number of Sri Lankan film in the Sri Lankan cinema.

References

External links

Sri Lankan male film actors
1956 births
2019 deaths
Stunt performers
Sinhalese male actors